Bo-reum is a Korean feminine given name. Unlike most Korean names, which are composed of two Sino-Korean roots each written with one hanja, "Boreum" is an indigenous Korean name: a single word meaning "half-month", "two weeks", "fortnight" and "fifteen days". It is one of a number of such indigenous names which became more popular in South Korea in the late 20th century.

People
People with this name include:
 Jung Bo-reum (born 1986), South Korean actress
 Han Bo-reum (born 1987), South Korean actress
 Kim Bo-reum (born 1993), South Korean speed skater

Fictional characters
Fictional characters with this name include:
 Yoon Bo-reum, in the 2017 South Korean television series Confession Couple

See also
List of Korean given names

References

Given names
Korean feminine given names